Arthur Wise may refer to:

 Hastings Arthur Wise (1954–2005), convicted American mass murderer
 Arthur Chamberlin Wise (1876–1952), co-owner of the Boston Braves baseball team